The Starbucks murders occurred on July 6, 1997, at a Starbucks store located in Georgetown, Washington, D.C., when three employees were killed.

Murder
The morning of Tuesday, July 8, the regional director for Starbucks, Dean Torrenga, toured the crime scene with police. He said, "nothing [like this] in the history of the company... has ever happened..."

Conviction and Trial
On the evening of Monday, March 1, 1999, Carl Derek Cooper was arrested and brought in for questioning in relation to a 1996 attempted murder of an off-duty Prince George's County police officer.

Cooper was charged with three counts of first-degree murder on March 5, 1999. On March 5, Keith Covington, was questioned by Metropolitan Police Department of the District of Columbia and the FBI for 15 hours. Covington acknowledged that he knew Evans, one of the 25-year-old victims, and that he grew up near Cooper but that was all. To avoid the death penalty, Cooper also admitted to the 1993 murder of a security guard, an attempted murder in 1996 and a series of robberies throughout D.C., Maryland, and Pennsylvania. In total, he plead guilty to 47 criminal counts as part of the plea bargain, in which prosecutors agreed at Cooper's behest not to charge his mother or his wife, Melissa, with related, lesser crimes.

Kenneth L. Wainstein, at the time an assistant U.S. attorney, described Cooper in court as the head of a thriving criminal business primed to use violence at the slightest sign of resistance. Wainstein said Cooper told associates, "If anyone bucks, bustle"—meaning, if there isn't instant cooperation, shoot. On April 25, 2000, Cooper was sentenced to life in prison without possibility of parole.

Anniversary
On July 6, 2022, the 25th anniversary of the murders, Starbucks held a ceremony at the store to remember the three employees.

In media
The FBI Files based the 13th episode of its fourth season on the murder, entitled The Coffee Shop Murders the episode aired January 31, 2002.

See also
Lululemon murder

References

Female murder victims
Male murder victims
Crime in Washington, D.C.
1997 in Washington, D.C.
1997 murders in the United States
Murder in the United States
Starbucks